A bicycle carrier, also commonly called a bike rack, is a device attached to an automobile or bus for transporting bicycles.

By vehicle type 

Bus mounted bike carriers are usually attached to the front of the bus. They may flip up against the bus, out of the way, when not carrying any bikes.

Automobile mounted bike carriers can be attached to the roof, rear trunk, or rear tow hitch, depending on the vehicle.

Bikes may be mounted in the carriers by clamping both wheels and providing some additional vertical support, by clamping the rear wheel and the front dropouts (necessitating the removal of the front wheel, which may be mounted separately on blades), or by clamping the top tube (usually in the case of rear hitch mounted carriers). There is a device available that connects from the stem to the seat post, to provide a top tube equivalent suitable for mounting in these carriers for step-through frame bicycles that do not have a top tube. Carriers that clamp on the front dropouts may also provide a built-in locking mechanism.
Carriers have been developed especially for the rear of pickup trucks that attach either to the bed or its sides.

Special long carriers have been developed to support long-wheelbase recumbents and tandems.

At least one manufacturer offers bicycle carriers for use on motorcycles. There is a list of 11 rear mount bike racks that are durable with many other optimum features

Children's bikes with wheels smaller than 16" may be too small for the racks on buses.

Transit authorities with bicycle carriers on buses
Transit authorities with bicycle carriers on buses:

Europe 
 Madrid, Spain, in urban buses (line 33)

North America

United States 
California:
 Santa Barbara Metropolitan Transit District (some routes)
 Santa Clara Valley Transportation Authority (Santa Clara)
 Santa Cruz Metropolitan Transit District (Santa Cruz)
 AC Transit (Alameda County, California and Oakland)
 San Francisco Municipal Railway (San Francisco)
 SamTrans (San Mateo County)
 Golden Gate Transit (Northern San Francisco Bay area)
 Los Angeles County Metropolitan Transportation Authority (Los Angeles County)
 Omnitrans (San Bernardino County)

District of Columbia
Washington Metropolitan Area Transit Authority
Georgia:
 Metropolitan Atlanta Rapid Transit Authority (Atlanta)
Illinois
 Chicago Transit Authority (Chicago)
Iowa
 CyRide (Ames)
Maine:

 Portland, Maine
Massachusetts :

Pioneer Valley Transit Authority of Western Massachusetts

Minnesota:

 Metro Transit (Minneapolis and Saint Paul)

New York:

 MTA New York City Bus - Bikes not permitted on most routes, but four routes have been equipped with bike racks in a pilot program.

Tennessee
 Memphis Area Transit Authority

Utah
 Utah Transit Authority
 Cache Valley Transit District in Logan, Utah

Virginia
Hampton Roads Transit
Williamsburg Area Transit Authority

Washington:
 King County Metro in King County, Washington
 Community Transit in Snohomish County, Washington.
Wisconsin:

 Milwaukee County Transit System in Milwaukee County, Wisconsin

Canada 

British Columbia
 Victoria Regional Transit System (Victoria)
 TransLink (Vancouver)
Ontario
 Durham Region Transit, Durham Region, Ontario
 Grand River Transit, Region of Waterloo, Ontario
Quebec
 STL, Laval, Quebec
 Exo Laurentides sector (Suburban Montreal)

Oceania

Australia
 ACTION in Canberra

New Zealand

 Metro in Christchurch, New Zealand (all routes)
 Dunedin
 Feilding
 Gisborne
Hamilton  (5 services to other towns)
 Hawkes Bay
 Invercargill
 Invercargill-Te Anau-Queenstown
 New Plymouth
 Nelson
 Palmerston North
Rotorua
 Taupo
Tauranga
Timaru
 Waiheke Island
Wellington
Whangarei

Gallery

See also
Bicycle and public transport
Flexfix (a bike carrier integrated into the car's design)
 Roof rack
 Sportworks

References

External links

 Consumer Reports buying guide
 World map of buses with bike racks
 U.S. Patent No. 5,692,659

Automotive accessories
Cycling equipment